East Vračar or Istočni Vračar (Serbian Cyrillic: Источни Врачар) is a former urban neighborhood and municipality of Belgrade, the capital of Serbia. It was located in Belgrade's municipality of Vračar to which it generally corresponds today.

Location 

Istočni Vračar was located in the area which is today covered by the territory of the municipality of Vračar and the westernmost section of the municipality of Zvezdara (local community (mesna zajednica) of Vračarsko Polje) and represents the eastern part of the former, much larger neighborhood of Vračar (see Zapadni Vračar).

History 

Istočni Vračar started to be built since 1880 when a Scottish businessman and Nazarene Francis Mackenzie bought a large piece of land nearby (which eventually became known as Englezovac, Serbian for Englishman's place), parcelled it out into lots for selling and donated a piece of land to the Serbian Orthodox Church for the construction of the Temple of Saint Sava.  Later, Istočni Vračar extended to Grantovac, an area of land belonging to the American consul Edward Maxwell Grant and Krunski Venac around the Krunska street, a street starting from the Royal Park and ending with Kalenić market.  Kalenić market is the largest open air market in Belgrade and is the commercial centre of modern Vračar.

Municipality 

The municipality of Vračar was officially formed in 1952 after Belgrade was administratively reorganized from districts (rejon) to municipalities. On 1 September 1955, Vračar was divided into Zapadni Vračar and Istočni Vračar. A year and a half later, on 1 January 1957, parts of Istočni Vračar merged with the municipality of Neimar and the western part of the municipality of Terazije to create a new, albeit smaller, municipality in Belgrade. Zapadni Vračar became municipality of Savski Venac, while the easternmost section of Istočni Vračar became part of the municipality of Zvezdara.

Neighborhoods of Belgrade
Former and proposed municipalities of Belgrade
Vračar
Zvezdara